Campanula californica is a species of flowering plant in the bellflower family Campanulaceae, known by the common names swamp bellflower and swamp harebell. It is endemic to California, where it grows along the coastline between Marin and Mendocino Counties. It is found mainly in wet areas such as bogs, marshes, and wet forest floors. This is a hairy rhizomatous perennial herb producing a thin, creeping stem 10 to 30 centimeters long. The thin, rippled leaves are oval in shape and between 1 and 2 centimeters long. The bell-shaped flower is pale blue with curving petals up to 1.5 centimeters long. The fruit is a ribbed, spherical capsule.

References

External links
Jepson Manual Treatment
USDA Plants Profile
Photo gallery

californica
Endemic flora of California
Plants described in 1863